The Idaho State Police (ISP) is the statewide law enforcement agency for the State of Idaho. It began as the Bureau of Constabulary, created on May 18, 1919, under the new Department of Law Enforcement, to detect and investigate crime, "order abatement of public nuisances and to enforce such orders by appropriate court action, to suppress riots, prevent wrongs to children and animals that are inhibited by law." The state constabulary was also charged with the organization of various state, county and municipal peace officers. The bureau was dissolved by the state legislature in 1923.

The Idaho State Police was formed  in 1939, when Governor C. A. Bottolfsen signed the bill on February 20.

Divisions
The Idaho State Police is divided geographically into six districts, with headquarters (and training facility) in Meridian, west of Boise.  District offices (1–3) are located in Coeur d'Alene, Lewiston, and Meridian.  District offices (4–6) are located in Jerome, Pocatello, and Idaho Falls.  Each district has a different captain and command staff, are managed separately and are overseen by a major. Each district has two divisions; patrol and investigations.

Patrol

The patrol division consists of uniformed state troopers who enforce the laws of Idaho. Commonly, a trooper will spend their time enforcing motor vehicle laws while on duty, primarily on state and federal highways.

Investigation

The investigation division consists of plainclothes detectives who enforce the laws of Idaho. The Idaho State Police detectives investigate major crimes such as homicide and large scale drug-related offenses.

Other divisions
 The Alcohol Beverage Control division ensures all establishments which sell or produce alcohol are properly licensed and conform to the law.
 Commercial Vehicle Specialists are specially trained uniformed officers who enforce federal and state laws pertaining to the safety of commercial trucking.
 The Cyber Crimes Unit specializes in crimes involving computers and the internet.
 The Bureau of Criminal Identification maintains the states fingerprint database.
 Forensic Services investigates controlled substances, crime scenes, firearms, forensic biology, impression evidence, toxicology, and trace evidence.
 Racing Commission provides oversight for horse racing activities within Idaho.
 Brands Board conducts livestock brand inspection, required for ownership changes, leaving Idaho and slaughter.

Other duties

The Idaho State Police has two regional communications centers staffed with dispatchers who provide support to officers in the field.

The Idaho State Police is tasked with the physical protection of the governor of the state as well as other dignitaries who may need protection.

Rank structure

See also

 List of law enforcement agencies in Idaho
 State police
 State patrol
 Highway patrol

References

External links
 Official ISP website

State law enforcement agencies of Idaho
Government agencies established in 1919
1919 establishments in Idaho